Below are the squads for the women's football tournament at the 2014 Asian Games, played in South Korea.

Group A

India
Coach: Tarun Roy

Maldives
Coach: Ibrahim Haleem

South Korea
Coach: Yoon Deok-yeo

Thailand
Coach: Nuengrutai Srathongvian

Group B

China
Coach: Hao Wei

Chinese Taipei
Coach:  Masayuki Nagira

Japan
Coach: Norio Sasaki

Jordan
Coach:  Masahiko Okiyama

Group C

Hong Kong
Coach: Chan Shuk Chi

North Korea
Coach: Kim Kwang-min

Vietnam
Coach: Mai Đức Chung

References

Squads

External links
Official website

Women
2014